Statistics New Zealand defines urban areas of New Zealand for statistical purposes (they have no administrative or legal basis). The urban areas comprise cities, towns and other conurbations (an aggregation of urban settlements) of a thousand people or more. In combination, the urban areas of the country constitute New Zealand's urban population.

The current standard for urban areas is the Statistical Standard for Geographic Areas 2018 (SSGA18), which replaced the New Zealand Standard Areas Classification 1992 (NZSAC92) in 2018.

There are four classes of urban area under SSGA18:
Major urban areas, with a population of 100,000 or more.
Large urban areas, with a population of 30,000 to 99,999.
Medium urban areas, with a population of 10,000 to 29,999.
Small urban areas, with a population of 1,000 to 9,999.
Each urban area consists of one or more level-2 statistical areas (SA2s). Urban areas under SSGA18 do not cross territorial authority boundaries, with one exception (Richmond, which lies in the Tasman District but includes the Daelyn SA2 area from neighbouring Nelson City).

Statistics New Zealand also defines rural settlements with a population of 200 to 999 people or at least 40 dwellings. While these do not fit the standard international definition of an urban population, they serve to distinguish between true rural dwellers and those in rural settlements or towns.

In 2023, Stats NZ updated the 2018 standard for geographical areas with the new NZ Statistical standard for geographic areas 2023. While similar, the new standard has added a new geographical area (SA3), has upgraded Wanaka to a medium urban area, seven rural settlements to small urban areas and has created thirteen new rural settlements.

Statistical Standard for Geographic Areas 2018
The following shows the urban areas as classified under SSGA18 (adjusted according to SSGA23 update).

Major urban areas
Auckland
Hamilton
Tauranga
Lower Hutt
Wellington
Christchurch
Dunedin

Large urban areas
Whangārei
Hibiscus Coast
Rotorua
Gisborne
Hastings
Napier
New Plymouth
Whanganui
Palmerston North
Porirua
Upper Hutt
Nelson
Invercargill

Medium urban areas

Pukekohe
Cambridge
Te Awamutu
Tokoroa
Taupō
Whakatāne
Havelock North 
Feilding
Levin
Waikanae 
Paraparaumu 
Masterton
Richmond 
Blenheim
Rangiora
Kaiapoi 
Rolleston
Ashburton
Timaru
Oamaru
Wānaka
Queenstown
Mosgiel

Small urban areas

Kaitaia 
Ahipara (1,390) 
Kerikeri 
Kaikohe 
Haruru 
Paihia 
Opua 
Moerewa 
Kawakawa 
Hikurangi 
Ngunguru 
One Tree Point 
Ruakākā 
Waipu 
Dargaville 
Mangawhai (1,150) 
Mangawhai Heads 
Wellsford 
Warkworth
Snells Beach 
Parakai 
Helensville 
Waimauku 
Muriwai 
Kumeū-Huapai 
Riverhead 
Waiheke West 
Clarks Beach 
Beachlands-Pine Harbour 
Maraetai 
Waiuku 
Patumahoe 
Coromandel 
Whitianga 
Thames 
Tairua 
Pauanui 
Whangamatā 
Ngatea 
Paeroa 
Waihi 
Tuakau 
Pōkeno 
Te Kauwhata 
Huntly 
Raglan 
Ngāruawāhia 
Morrinsville 
Te Aroha 
Matamata 
Pirongia 
Kihikihi 
Ōtorohanga 
Putāruru 
Te Kūiti 
Turangi 
Waihi Beach-Bowentown 
Katikati 
Ōmokoroa 
Maketu (1,330) 
Te Puke 
Ngongotahā 
Edgecumbe 
Ōhope 
Murupara 
Kawerau 
Ōpōtiki 
Wairoa 
Haumoana (1,290) 
Clive 
Waipawa 
Waipukurau 
Ōakura 
Waitara 
Inglewood 
Stratford 
Ōpunake 
Eltham 
Normanby (1,090) 
Hāwera 
Patea 
Taumarunui 
Raetihi 
Ohakune 
Taihape 
Marton 
Bulls 
Ashhurst 
Woodville 
Dannevirke 
Pahiatua 
Foxton Beach 
Foxton 
Shannon 
Ōtaki Beach 
Ōtaki 
Paekākāriki 
Carterton 
Featherston 
Greytown 
Martinborough 
Tākaka 
Motueka 
Māpua 
Wakefield 
Brightwater 
Hope 
Picton 
Renwick 
Kaikōura 
Westport 
Reefton 
Runanga 
Greymouth 
Hokitika 
Hanmer Springs (1,100) 
Amberley 
Oxford 
Woodend 
Pegasus 
Lyttelton 
Burnham (1,290) 
Diamond Harbour 
Darfield 
West Melton 
Prebbleton 
Leeston 
Lincoln 
Methven 
Rakaia 
Geraldine 
Pleasant Point 
Temuka 
Twizel 
Waimate 
Cromwell 
Clyde 
Alexandra 
Arthurs Point 
Lake Hāwea 
Arrowtown 
Lake Hayes 
Waikouaiti 
Brighton 
Balclutha 
Milton 
Te Anau 
Winton 
Riverton / Aparima 
Gore 
Mataura 
Bluff

Rural settlements

North Island

Algies Bay (1,040) 
Arapuni (310) 
Athenree (3,160) 
Ātiamuri (72) 
Awanui (405) 
Baddeleys Beach-Campbells Beach (100) 
Baylys Beach (340) 
Benneydale (200) 
Te Henga / Bethells Beach (280) 
Bombay, New Zealand (740)
Buckleton Beach  
Bunnythorpe (720) 
Cable Bay (890) 
Castlepoint (60) 
Clevedon, New Zealand (640)  
Cooks Beach-Ferry Landing (550)
Coopers Beach (660) 
Egmont Village (350) 
Eketāhuna (530) 
Fairview (320) 
Five Mile Bay - Waitahanui (580) 
Frasertown (260) 
Glenbrook Beach (320)
Grahams Beach (Big Bay-Grahams Beach) (140) 
Hahei (280) 
Halcombe (500) 
Hamurana (1,080)  
Hatepe  
Hicks Bay (180) 
Hihi (190) 
Himatangi Beach (530) 
Hiwinui (360) 
Hokio Beach (200) 
Horotiu (690) 
Huia (680) 
Hunterville (430) 
Hunua  
Kaeo (240) 
Kaiaua (450) 
Kai Iwi (150) 
Kaimaumau (160) 
Kaingaroa (420) 
Kaipara Flats (180) 
Kaiwaka (830) 
Kaponga (320) 
Karangahake (340) 
Karapiro Village (330) 
Karekare (270) 
Karikari (530) 
Kaukapakapa (960) 
Kawakawa Bay (690) 
Kawau Island (80) 
Kawhia (410) 
Kerepehi (560) 
Kerikeri Inlet (480) 
Kimbolton (240) 
Kingseat (620) 
Kinloch (800) 
Kohukohu (180) 
Koitiata (130) 
Kūaotunu (260) 
Kuratau (100) 
Lake Ōkareka (520) 
Lake Tarawera (280) 
Leigh (650) 
Lepperton (460) 
Longburn (370) 
Mahia Beach (200) 
Mahurangi West (90) 
Mamaku (900) 
Manaia (1,000) 
Manakau (500) 
Mangakino (880) 
Mangaore (80) 
Mangaweka (90) 
Mangōnui (660) 
Manutūkē (420) 
Marokopa  
Matakana (540) 
Matakawau Point (110) 
Matapouri (220) 
Matarangi (520) 
Matatā (710) 
Mātāwai (114) 
Maungakaramea  
Maungatapere (290) 
Maungaturoto (1,000) 
Medlands Beach (90) 
Meremere (620) 
Midhirst (260) 
Minginui (360) 
Mōkau (120) 
Motuoapa (390) 
Mourea (420) 
National Park, New Zealand (230) 
Ngāhinapōuri (210) 
Ngawha Springs (160) 
Norsewood (140) 
Nūhaka (210) 
Oakura-Whangaruru South (170) 
Ōhaeawai (450) 
Ohakea (370) 
Ōhau (800) 
Ōhaupō (660) 
Ohawe (230) 
Ōhiwa (180) 
Ōhura (120) 
Ōkaihau (350) 
Ōkato (670) 
Okere Falls (410) 
Okiato (200) 
Okupu  
Ōkura (390) 
Omaha, New Zealand (800) 
Ōmāpere (450) 
Ōmiha (520) 
Ōmori (220) 
Onaero Beach (80) 
Onemana (170) 
Ongaonga (180) 
Ongare Point-Kauri Point (310) 
Opononi (270) 
Ōrere Point (360) 
Ormondville (70) 
Orua Bay (360) 
Oruatua-Te Rangiita-Waitetoko (170) 
Ōtāne (740) 
Ōwhango (180) 
Paengaroa (870) 
Paerata (560) 
Pahi (260) 
Paparoa (380) 
Parau (530) 
Pāremoremo (530) 
Parua Bay (640) 
Pataua (200) 
Pātūtahi (350) 
Piha (1,060) 
Piopio (480) 
Plummers Point (190) 
Pohangina (220) 
Point Wells (560) 
Pongaroa (90) 
Pōrangahau (160) 
Port Albert (130) 
Port Waikato (560) 
Puhoi (390) 
Pukehina Beach (860) 
Pukenui (750) 
Puriri (250) 
Rangataua (140) 
Rangitāne (380) 
Ratana (370) 
Raurimu (70) 
Rawene (530) 
Rings Beach (130)
Riversdale Beach (360) 
Rongotea (690) 
Rotoiti (540) 
Rotoma (270) 
Ruatoria (820) 
Ruawai (500) 
Rukuhia (170) 
Russell (800) 
Sandspit, New Zealand (550) 
Sanson, New Zealand (630) 
Scotts Landing-Mahurangi East (180) 
Shelly Beach, New Zealand (260) 
Stillwater (1,040) 
Taharoa (180) 
Tahuna  
Taipa (180) 
Takapau (640) 
Tāneatua (980) 
Tangimoana (310) 
Tanners Point (210) 
Tapu (260) 
Taupiri (530) 
Te Araroa (160) 
Te Awanga (840) 
Te Hana (110) 
Te Horo Beach (360) 
Te Kaha (340) 
Te Karaka (550) 
Te Kōpuru (530) 
Te Kowhai (520) 
Te Puna West (440) 
Te Puru (580) 
Te Teko (480) 
Thornton Bay-Ngarimu Bay (330) 
Tikitere (750) 
Tikokino (210) 
Ti Point (140) 
Tīrau (860) 
Tokerau Beach (260) 
Tokomaru (590) 
Tokomaru Bay (470) 
Tolaga Bay (890) 
Tryphena (210) 
Tuai (230) 
Turua (400) 
Tutukaka (790) 
Urenui (430) 
Waharoa (680) 
Waiau Pa (480) 
Waihou (330) 
Waiinu Beach (80)
Waikawa Beach (150) 
Waikino (320) 
Waimārama (240) 
Waiomu (370) 
Waiouru (790) 
Waipapa (190) 
Waipu Cove-Langs Beach (310) 
Wairakei Village (550) 
Waitakere Village  
Waitangi, Northland (50) 
Waitarere Beach (750) 
Waitoa (300) 
Waitōtara (70) 
Waiwera (250) 
Waverley (830) 
Weiti Village  
Whakamaru (170) 
Whakatu (680) 
Whangapoua (90) 
Whangārei Heads (1,060) 
Whangaroa (150) 
Whangateau (130) 
Whareroa  
Whatawhata (320) 
Whirinaki (430) 
Whiritoa (250)

South Island

Ahaura (100)
Akaroa (800)
Allanton (310) 
Amberley Beach (180)
Anakiwa (180)
Aramoana (120) 
Arthur's Pass (50)
Ashley (420)
Balfour (120) 
Bannockburn (580)
Benhar (90)
Birdling's Flat (210) 
Blackball (290)
Carters Beach (340) 
Castle Hill (30)
Cave (80)
Cheviot (360) 
Clinton (300)
Coalgate (370)
Collingwood (300) 
Culverden (370)
Cust (410)
Dobson (590) 
Doyleston (340)
Dunsandel (460)
Duntroon (100) 
Duvauchelle (170)
Edendale (600)
Ettrick (180) 
Fairlie (910)
Fox Glacier (260)
Franz Josef (530) 
Glenavy (210)
Glenorchy (380)
Glentunnel (180) 
Governors Bay (940)
Granity (160)
Grovetown (380) 
Haast (90)
Hampden (350)
Harihari (260)
Harwood (240)
Havelock (630) 
Hawarden (250)
Hāwea Flat (630)
Herbert (100) 
Hinds (310)
Hororata (220)
Jack's Point (1,540) 
Kaitangata (760)
Kaiteriteri (390)
Kakanui (430) 
Kaka Point (230)
Kaniere (300)
Karamea (380) 
Karitane (420)
Kennington (120)
Kingston (360) 
Kirwee (1,040)
Kumara (290)
Kurow (380) 
Lake Hood (420)
Lake Roxburgh Village (80)
Lawrence (460) 
Leithfield (600)
Leithfield Beach (410)
Ligar Bay (130) 
Little River (290)
Luggate (600)
Lumsden (530) 
Maheno (130)
Makikihi (90)
Malvern Hills-Whitecliffs (190) 
Manapouri (240)
Marahau (250)
Marlborough Ridge (230) 
Middlemarch (160)
Milford Huts (90)
Millbrook (140) 
Millers Flat (90)
Moana (70)
Moeraki (120) 
Mossburn (180)
Mount Somers (160)
Mount Cook Village (230) 
Murchison (500)
Naseby (130)
Ngakawau-Hector (190) 
Ngākuta Bay (60)
Nightcaps (310)
Ohai (270)
Okiwi Bay (70)
Omakau (370) 
Omarama (310)
Orari (170)
Otakou-Harington Point (200) 
Otautau (790)
Otematata (200)
Outram (790) 
Owaka (320)
Palmerston (1,000)
Parapara (100) 
Pareora (490)
Pisa Moorings (750)
Pohara (550) 
Pounawea (50)
Purakaunui (230)
Purau (70) 
Rai Valley (190)
Ranfurly (740)
Rarangi (690) 
Riversdale (420)
Riwaka (810)
Ross (280) 
Rotherham (150)
Roxburgh (600)
Ruby Bay (750) 
Seddon (580)
Sefton (220)
Selwyn Huts (100) 
Sheffield and Waddington (350)
Southbridge (960)
Spencerville (520) 
Spring Creek (610)
Springfield (360)
Springston (560) 
St Andrews (200)
St Arnaud (130)
Stirling (340) 
Taieri Mouth (280)
Tai Tapu (620)
Takamatua (110) 
Tapanui (800)
Tapawera (350)
Tasman (560) 
Tekapo (720)
The Pines Beach (350)
Tuamarina (240) 
Tuatapere (550)
Waiau (270)
Waihola (450) 
Waikaia (140)
Waikari (280)
Waikuku (170) 
Waikuku Beach (940)
Waimangaroa (220)
Waipara (320) 
Waipopo (90)
Wairau Valley (250)
Waitati-Doctors Point (620) 
Wallacetown (730)
Ward (90)
Warrington (510) 
Winchester (270)
Woodbourne (690)
Woodbury (110) 
Woodend Beach (290)
Woodlands (290)
Wyndham (600)

Offshore islands
Oban, Stewart Island (320)
Waitangi, Chatham Islands (210)

New Zealand Standard Areas Classification 1992
Under the New Zealand Standard Areas Classification 1992 (NZSAC92), there are three classes of urban area:
Main urban areas, with a population of 30,000 or more. These 17 areas mostly correspond to the places known by New Zealanders as cities.
Secondary urban areas are the 14 urban areas with a population of 10,000 to 29,999.
Minor urban areas make up the remainder of the urban population of the country, towns with 1,000 to 9,999 people. There are 103 minor urban areas.

Main urban areas
The population figures shown are Statistics New Zealand's resident population estimates at  For rankings in various criteria see the ranked list of New Zealand urban areas. Four main urban areas are subdivided into urban zones. The following cities are listed by location from north to south.

North Island

Whangārei: from Hikurangi to Portland.
Auckland is divided into four urban zones:
Northern Auckland Urban Zone:
the part of Rodney District known as the Hibiscus Coast, from Waiwera south, including Orewa and the Whangaparaoa Peninsula
all of North Shore City
Western Auckland Urban Zone:
the part of Rodney District around Kumeū
the urban part of West Auckland
Central Auckland Urban Zone: Auckland isthmus, including the Auckland CBD and inner suburbs
Southern Auckland Urban Zone:
the urban part of Manukau City
Papakura District
Whangapouri Creek and Runciman in Franklin District
Hamilton is divided into three urban zones:
Hamilton Urban Zone: all of Hamilton City and neighbouring parts of Waikato and Waipa districts including Ngāruawāhia, Taupiri and Ōhaupō
Cambridge Urban Zone: includes Leamington
Te Awamutu Urban Zone: includes Kihikihi
Tauranga: Omokoroa to Papamoa Beach; and Mount Maunganui to Tauriko and Pyes Pa
Rotorua: Ngongotahā to Owhata
Gisborne: Makaraka to Okitu
Napier-Hastings is a conurbation of two urban zones:
Napier: Includes Napier City, Taradale, Eskdale,  Waiohiki, Meeanee and Bay View. From Bay View to Awatoto
Hastings: From Havelock North to Flaxmere, includes Te Awanga, Haumoana, Pakowhai and Pakipaki
New Plymouth: Oakura to Bell Block
Wanganui: Westmere to Marybank
Palmerston North: Including Longburn, Kairanga and Stony Creek, but excluding Ashhurst and rural areas in the Tararua foothills
Kapiti: Pekapeka to Paekākāriki
Wellington is divided into four urban zones:
Upper Hutt: Te Marua to Pinehaven
Lower Hutt: includes Wainuiomata, Petone and the eastern bays, excludes farmland adjacent to Wainuiomata
Porirua: all of Porirua City except Paekākāriki Hill and Mana Island; includes Pukerua Bay and Pauatahanui
Wellington City: from Linden south, includes Horokiwi but excludes Mākara and Ohariu

South Island

Nelson: from Glenduan to the Wairoa River, includes Richmond but excludes Whangamoa
Blenheim: From Renwick to Riverlands and south to Wither Hills
Christchurch: Christchurch City, Kaiapoi, and up to the Waimakariri River, Prebbleton, Tai Tapu and Lyttelton Harbour including Diamond Harbour
Dunedin: from Mosgiel and Brighton to Pine Hill, Ravensbourne to Aramoana
Invercargill: Makarewa to Woodend and west to Otatara

Secondary urban areas
The population figures shown are Statistics New Zealand's resident population estimates at the 
The following towns are listed by location from north to south.

North Island
Pukekohe: From Paerata to Tuakau. Excludes Bombay.
Whakatāne: From Coastlands to Ōhope and south to Poroporo.
Tokoroa: From Tokoroa to Kinleith.
Taupō: From Wairakei to Taupō Airport.
Hāwera: From Normanby to Mokoia.
Feilding: From Halcombe to Aorangi.
Levin: From Waitarere Beach to Ohau.
Masterton: From Opaki to Waingawa.

South Island
Greymouth: From Runanga to Southbeach and Camerons.
Rangiora: From the Ashley River to Flaxton
Ashburton: From Fairton to Winslow and Argyle Park.
Timaru: From Washdyke to Scarborough and west to Gleniti.
Queenstown: From Fernhill and Kelvin Heights to Frankton
Oamaru: From Pukeuri to Weston and Holmes Hill.

Minor urban areas

North Island

Taipa Bay-Mangonui
Kaitaia
Kerikeri
Paihia
Kawakawa
Moerewa
Kaikohe
Dargaville
Ngunguru
Mangawhai Heads
Wellsford
Warkworth
Snells Beach
Helensville
Waiheke Island
Waiuku
Coromandel
Whitianga
Tairua
Thames
Whangamatā
Ngatea
Paeroa
Waihi
Te Kauwhata
Huntly
Raglan
Ōtorohanga
Te Kūiti
Te Aroha
Morrinsville
Matamata
Putāruru
Tūrangi
Waihi Beach
Katikati Community
Te Puke Community
Edgecumbe
Kawerau
Murupara
Ōpōtiki
Wairoa
Waipawa
Waipukurau
Waitara
Inglewood
Stratford
Eltham
Ōpunake
Patea
Taumarunui
Ohakune
Raetihi
Waiouru
Taihape
Marton
Bulls
Dannevirke
Woodville
Pahiatua
Foxton Community
Shannon
Ōtaki
Carterton
Greytown
Featherston
Martinborough

South Island

Tākaka
Motueka
Māpua
Brightwater
Wakefield
Picton
Westport
Reefton
Hokitika
Kaikōura
Amberley
Oxford
Woodend
Darfield
Rolleston
Lincoln 
Leeston
Methven
Rakaia
Geraldine 
Temuka 
Pleasant Point 
Twizel Community
Waimate
Wānaka
Arrowtown
Cromwell 
Alexandra
Waikouaiti
Milton
Balclutha
Te Anau
Gore
Winton
Riverton / Aparima 
Bluff 

Changes to classification
1992
Original classification

1996
No change

2001
Kapiti promoted from secondary to main urban area
Rolleston added as minor urban area
Pauanui Beach dropped to rural centre

2006
Edgecumbe Community renamed Edgecumbe

2013
Blenheim promoted from secondary to main urban area
Rangiora and Queenstown promoted from minor to secondary urban areas
Gore demoted from secondary to minor urban area
Ngunguru, Mangawhai Heads, Te Kauwhata, Ngatea, Mapua, Amberley, Methven, Rakaia and Waikouaiti added as minor urban areas
Russell, Mangakino, Manaia and Hanmer Springs dropped to rural centres

Related lists
 List of New Zealand urban areas by population – a simplified ranked list
 List of Functional Urban Areas in New Zealand - Stats NZ recently defined 53 Functional Urban Areas in New Zealand
 List of cities in New Zealand
 List of towns in New Zealand

References

 Urban areas of New Zealand